

References

Cambridgreshire
King G
Lists of buildings and structures in Cambridgeshire